Live in Zurich may refer to:

 Live in Zurich (World Saxophone Quartet album)
 Live in Zurich (Marilyn Crispell album)